Saltwater is a 2000 Irish drama film written and directed by Conor McPherson. The film stars Peter McDonald, Brian Cox, Conor Mullen, Laurence Kinlan, Brendan Gleeson, Eva Birthistle and Paul Cooper. The film was released on 29 September 2000, by Buena Vista International.

Plot

Cast       

Peter McDonald as Frank Beneventi
Brian Cox as George Beneventi
Conor Mullen as Ray Sullivan
Laurence Kinlan as Joe Beneventi
Brendan Gleeson as Simple Simon
Eva Birthistle as Deborah McCeever
Valerie Spelman as Carmel Beneventi
David O'Rourke as Damien Fitzgibbon
Caroline O'Boyle as Tara
Gina Moxley as Sgt. Duggan
Garrett Keogh as Tony Regan
Michael McElhatton as John Traynor
Pat Shortt as Mr Fanning
Carl Duering as Konigsberg
Olwen Fouéré as Trish Meehan 
Alan King as Charlie
Mark Dunne as Junior
Billy Roche as Larry 
Anto Nolan as Bouncer One Tony
Simon Delaney as Bouncer Two Darren
Deirdre O'Kane as Maria Beneventi
Lisa Tierney Keogh as Orla
Hilda Fay as Cloakroom Att.
Nuala O'Neill as Michelle
Kevin Hely as Barman Teddy
Andrew Bennett as Garda
Sean Flanagan as Lawless
Simon Jewell as Duignan
Peter Coonan as Rooney
Ciaran Delaney as Hennessy
Michael Coonan as Logan
Lesley Conroy as Lisa

References

External links
 
 

2000 films
English-language Irish films
Irish drama films
2000 drama films
BBC Film films
2000s English-language films
Films directed by Conor McPherson